King Mob was an English radical group based in London during the late 1960s/early 1970s.

It was a cultural mutation of the Situationists and the anarchist group UAW/MF. It sought to emphasise the cultural anarchy and disorder being ignored in Britain, with the ultimate aim of promoting proletarian revolution. It derived its name from Christopher Hibbert's 1958 book on the Gordon Riots of June 1780, in which rioters daubed the slogan "His Majesty King Mob" on the walls of Newgate Prison, after gutting the building.

Actions
King Mob appreciated pop culture and distributed its ideas through various posters and through its publication King Mob Echo, which provoked reaction by celebrating killers like Jack the Ripper, Mary Bell and John Christie. One flyer in particular celebrated Valerie Solanas' 1968 shooting of Andy Warhol and included a hit-list of Yoko Ono, Mick Jagger, Bob Dylan, Richard Hamilton, Mario Amaya (who was also shot by Solanas), David Hockney, Mary Quant, Twiggy, Marianne Faithfull and the IT editor Barry Miles.

The King Mob group allegedly planned a series of audacious actions, including blowing up a waterfall in the Lake District, painting the poet Wordsworth's house with the words "Coleridge Lives", and hanging peacocks in Holland Park,  London. However, none of the aforementioned plans were executed. An action that was carried out, inspired by the New York-based Black Mask's "mill-in at Macy's", involved King Mob appearing at the Selfridges store in London, with one member, dressed as Father Christmas, attempting to distribute all of the store's toys to children. Police subsequently forced the children to return the toys. This action involved Malcolm McLaren who reputedly applied the group's situationist ideas in the promotion of the Sex Pistols.

Graffiti
Graffiti attributed to King Mob was observed in many places, particularly in the Notting Hill area, including, "I don't believe in nothing - I feel like they ought to burn down the world - just let it burn down baby."

The most celebrated graffiti attributed to King Mob was the slogan which was painted along a half-mile section of the wall beside the tube (railway) commuter route into London between Ladbroke Grove and Westbourne Park tube stations in west London:

"Same thing day after day- tube - work - dinner - work - tube - armchair - TV - sleep - tube - work - how much more can you take? - one in ten go mad, one in five cracks up."

See also
Anti-art
The Angry Brigade

References

Sources 
"The End of Music", a pamphlet written by David and Stuart Wise in the mid- to late-1970s and published in Glasgow. The text was later reprinted by AK Press in the 1990s as part of Stewart Home's book What is Situationism? A Reader.
King Mob. Nosotros, el Partido del Diablo, Spanish compilation of King Mob texts, edited by La Felguera Ediciones in 2007
The Situationist International in Britain: Modernism, Surrealism, and the Avant-Gardes (Routledge 2016)

Anti-consumerist groups
British artist groups and collectives
Underground culture
Situationist International
Newgate Prison